is a railway station on the West Japan Railway Company Hanwa Line in Abeno-ku, Osaka, Osaka Prefecture, Japan. The station opened on 3 June 1931.

Layout
This station has two elevated side platforms serving a track each.

Surroundings
Koboreguchi Station (Kintetsu Minami Osaka Line)
Super-Sanko Bishoen
Meijo Gakuin High School
Osaka Girl's Senior High School
Osaka Prefectural Tennoji High School
Osaka City Kogei Senior High School
Osaka College of Art (The Group of Osaka University of Arts)

Bus route
Osaka Municipal Transportation Bureau (Bishoen)
Route 6 for Abenobashi / for Sunjiyata via Shirasagi Koen-mae

History
 3 June 1931 - Bishoen Station opened on the Hanwa Railway Line between Hanwa Tennoji and Minami-Tanabe stations.
 1 December 1940 - Hanwa Railway was consolidated by Nankai Railway and Bishoen Station became a train station on the Nankai Railway Yamate Line.
 1 May 1944 - The Nankai Railway Yamate Line was nationalized and Bishoen Station became a train station on the Japanese National Railways Hanwa Line.
 14 February 1945 - The station was closed after Abeno-ku was bombed by Boeing B-29 of the US Forces.
 15 April 1947 - The station was reopened.
 1958 - The renovation of the station was started.
 13 May 1958 - The renovation of the station was completed.
 August 1969 - The west gate was situated.
 1 April 1987 - JNR was privatized and Bishoen Station became a train station operated by West Japan Railway Company.
 March 2018 - Station numbering was introduced with Bishōen being assigned station number JR-R21.

References 

Abeno-ku, Osaka
Railway stations in Japan opened in 1931
Railway stations in Osaka